Sotolon (also known as sotolone) is a lactone and an extremely powerful aroma compound, with the typical smell of fenugreek or curry at high concentrations and maple syrup, caramel, or burnt sugar at lower concentrations. Sotolon is the major aroma and flavor component of fenugreek seed and lovage, and is one of several aromatic and flavor components of artificial maple syrup. It is also present in molasses, aged rum, aged sake and white wine, flor sherry, roast tobacco, and dried fruiting bodies of the mushroom Lactarius helvus. Sotolon can pass through the body relatively unchanged, and consumption of foods high in sotolon, such as fenugreek, can impart a maple syrup aroma to one's sweat and urine. In some individuals with the genetic disorder maple syrup urine disease, it is spontaneously produced in their bodies and excreted in their urine, leading to the disease's characteristic smell.

This molecule is thought to be responsible for the mysterious maple syrup smell that has occasionally wafted over Manhattan since 2005. Sotolon was first isolated in 1975 from the herb fenugreek.  The compound was named in 1980 when it was found to be responsible for the flavor of raw cane sugar:  soto- means "raw sugar" in Japanese and -olon signifies that the molecule is an enol lactone.

Several aging-derived compounds have been pointed out as playing an important role on the aroma of fortified wines; however, sotolon (3-hydroxy-4,5-dimethyl-2(5H)-furanone) is recognized as being the key odorant and has also been classified as a potential aging marker of these type of wines. This chiral lactone is a powerful odorant, which can impart a nutty, caramel, curry, or rancid odor, depending on its concentration and enantiomeric distribution. Despite being pointed out as a key odorant of other fortified wines, the researchers’ attention has also been directed to its off-flavor character, associated to the premature oxidative aging of young dry white wines, overlapping the expected fruity, flowery, and fresh character. This compound can be detected by miniaturized emulsification extraction followed by GC–MS/SIM  and single-step miniaturized liquid-liquid extraction followed by LC-MS/MS analysis

French vin jaune
Vin jaune is marked by the formation of sotolon from α-ketobutyric acid.

See also
Candy cap (Lactarius mushroom species whose maple syrup aroma derives from quabalactone III, which hydrolyzes into sotolon)

References

Flavors
Furanones
Enols